Lockheed PV-2 Harpoon, U.S. Navy Bureau Number 37396 , civil registration N7265C, named "Hot Stuff", is located at 3867 N. Aviation Way, Mount Comfort, Indiana.  The aircraft, an intact example of a World War II anti-submarine patrol bomber, was added to the National Register of Historic Places on April 23, 2009.  It was built in 1945 by the Lockheed Aircraft Corporation, and is one of only 104 built of this PV-2 variant of the Lockheed Ventura.  At the time of its listing, it was the only complete, operable example of a PV-2 in the United States, although one was being restored in Wisconsin.  While this particular plane did not see combat, the type was used in the Aleutian Islands during World War II. The property was the featured listing in the National Park Service's weekly list of May 1, 2009.

See also 
 Lockheed Ventura

References

External links
 National Register of Historic Places Registration Form for this aircraft

Buildings and structures on the National Register of Historic Places in Indiana
Individual aircraft of World War II
Lockheed aircraft
World War II patrol aircraft of the United States
National Register of Historic Places in Hancock County, Indiana